Tolumonas osonensis is a Gram-negative, rod-shaped bacterium in the genus Tolumonas. It has been studied as a biological producer of ethanol and lactate.

References

External links
Type strain of Tolumonas osonensis at BacDive -  the Bacterial Diversity Metadatabase

Aeromonadales
Bacteria described in 2011